The 2023 Spikers' Turf Open Conference is the sixteenth conference and the start of the sixth season of the Spikers' Turf. The tournament began on January 22, 2023, with a total of eleven teams, including four new teams at the Paco Arena, Paco, Manila. This conference also debuts the use of the Video Challenge system in the league.

Participating teams

Transactions

Team additions and transfers 
The following are the players who transferred to another team for this conference.

Venue

Format 
Preliminary round
 The eleven teams are competing in a single round-robin elimination.
 Top four teams advance to semifinals.

Semifinals
 The four teams will compete again in a single round-robin elimination.
 The third and fourth ranked teams will advance to the bronze medal match.
 The first and second ranked teams will advance to the gold medal match.

Finals 
 Best-of-three series.
 Bronze medal: SF Ranked 3 vs. SF Ranked 4
 Gold medal: SF Ranked 1 vs. SF Ranked 2

Pool standing procedure 
 Number of matches won
 Match points
 Sets ratio
 Points ratio
 If the tie continues as per the point ratio between two teams, the priority will be given to the team which won the last match between them. When the tie in points ratio is between three or more teams, a new classification of these teams in the terms of points 1, 2 and 3 will be made taking into consideration only the matches in which they were opposed to each other.

Match won 3–0 or 3–1: 3 match points for the winner, 0 match points for the loser
Match won 3–2: 2 match points for the winner, 1 match point for the loser.

Preliminary round 
 All times are Philippine Standard Time (UTC+08:00).

Ranking 

|}

Match results 
|}

Final round 
All times are Philippine Standard Time (UTC+8:00).

Semifinals

Ranking 

|}

Match results 
|}

Finals 

 All are best-of-three series.

3rd place 
|}

Championship 
|}
Note:

Awards

Final standings

See also 
 2023 Premier Volleyball League All-Filipino Conference

References 

Spikers' Turf
2023 in Philippine sport
2023 in volleyball
2023 in men's volleyball
January 2023 sports events in the Philippines
Current volleyball seasons
February 2023 sports events in the Philippines
March 2023 sports events in the Philippines